Jarrett Hicks (born on April 4, 1984 in Houston, Texas) is an American football player.

Career
Collegiately, Hicks was a wide receiver for the Texas Tech Red Raiders. Out of college, he signed as an undrafted free agent with the San Diego Chargers of the NFL. However, Hicks was released from the team on July 30, 2007.

Los Angeles Avengers
Hicks played for the AFL's Los Angeles Avengers. This reunited him with former teammate, Sonny Cumbie, who was a starting quarterback at Texas Tech and later the starting quarterback for the Avengers.

Current job
Jarrett Hicks continued his football life by becoming a coach. He now coaches high school football in his home state of Texas.

References

External links
 

1984 births
Living people
American football wide receivers
Texas Tech Red Raiders football players
San Diego Chargers players
Los Angeles Avengers players